Shah Hirul is a Singaporean footballer who plays for Balestier Khalsa as a midfielder.

Before moving to the Tigers, he was with Geylang International.

Club career

Geylang International

He has been with Geylang International FC since he was 16 year old, playing in their youth team before being promoted to the senior squad. He was part of the squad that won the Singapore Cup in 2009.

Balestier Khalsa
In 2016, after being released by the Eagle, he joined the Tiger. He extended his contract for another year in 2017.

References

Singaporean footballers
Singapore Premier League players
1986 births
Living people
Association football midfielders
Balestier Khalsa FC players